The Cylindrotomidae or long-bodied craneflies are a family of crane flies. About 115 species in 9 genera occur worldwide.

Most recent classifications place the group to family level. this was not supported by recent phylogenetic analyses by Petersen et al. however
Zhang et al. have overturned this with their phylogenetic analyses. Thus they remain an established family.

Description
They are mostly large flies of around 11–16 mm and yellowish to pale brownish in colour. They have long, slender antennae with 16 segments; the wings, legs and the abdomen are all very long.

Biology
The larvae are all phytophagous (with the exception of the genus Cylindrotoma) and are found living on terrestrial, semiaquatic and aquatic mosses. The larvae of the genus Cylindrotoma live on various flowering plants. Adults are found in damp, wooded habitats.

Classification
Subfamily Cylindrotominae
Cylindrotoma Macquart, 1834
Diogma Edwards, 1938
Liogma Osten Sacken, 1869
Phalacrocera Schiner, 1863
Triogma Schiner, 1863
Subfamily Stibadocerinae
Stibadocera Enderlein, 1912
Stibadocerella Brunetti, 1918
Stibadocerina Alexander, 1929
Stibadocerodes Alexander, 1928

References

 

 
Nematocera families